Elections to the Constituent Reichstag of the North German Confederation were held on 12 February 1867, with run-off elections during the following weeks. The National Liberal Party emerged as the largest party, winning 80 seats and receiving strong support in Hanover, Kassel and Nassau. Voter turnout was around 65% in Prussian constituencies. After the Constituent Reichstag had drawn up and agreed a constitution, fresh elections were held in August.

Electoral system
The North German Confederation were divided into 297 single-member electoral constituencies. Elections were conducted under the two-round system. All men over the age of 25, who were in full enjoyment of their civil rights, who were resident in the place of election and had nationality in one of the States belonging to the Confederation for at least three years, who were not under guardianship or curate, who were not engaged in bankruptcy proceedings, and who were not in receipt of public assistance were eligible to vote.

Results

Parliamentary groups 
Two separate parliamentary groups would later be formed: the Free Association out of 11 liberals and 3 conservatives; and the Federal-Constitutional Association, out of 7 Schleswig-Holstein particularist liberals, one other liberal, 4 clericals, all 9 German-Hanoverians, and one independent conservative.

References

1867 02
North Germany
1867 elections in Germany
February 1867 events